Star Trek V: The Final Frontier is a 1989 video game published by Mindscape.

Gameplay
Star Trek V: The Final Frontier is a game in which the crew of the Enterprise voyages to Sha Ka Ree as seen in the film Star Trek V: The Final Frontier.

Reception
John Harrington reviewed Star Trek V: The Final Frontier for Games International magazine, and gave it 2 stars out of 5, and stated that "Despite the graphics and the very familiar subject matter, it is not particularly addictive. It is, perhaps, a bit too cerebral for your average shoot-em-up fan and probably a little too reliant on arcade adventure to appeal to the adult market."

Charles Ardai reviewed the game for Computer Gaming World, and stated that "It could have been so much more, though, than ten minutes of excitement followed by twenty years in a display case. That it isn't, especially with so much going for it, is a true pity."

Reviews
ACE (Advanced Computer Entertainment) - Dec, 1989
The Games Machine - Mar, 1990
Zero - Feb, 1990
ASM (Aktueller Software Markt) - Dec, 1989

References

External links
Review in Compute!

1989 video games
DOS games
DOS-only games
Mindscape games
Space combat simulators
Starship simulators based on Star Trek
Video games based on films
Video games based on Star Trek (film franchise)
Video games developed in the United States